Saptha Kanya (Meaning - Seven Virgins) (also known as Upper Laxapana Mountain Range) is a mountain range in Maskeliya, Sri Lanka. In Tamil it is known as Anjimalai (Meaning - The Five Peaks). It is a ridge of seven peaks near the Norton Estate bordering the Sabaragamuwa Province and Central Province. The tallest peak is 1,569 m from the sea level.

Origin of Name
The literal meaning of the name Saptha Kanya is Seven Virgins. However, folklore also mentions that the name is a corruption of Svaptha Kanya, meaning Sleeping Virgin.

Aircraft Incident

4 December 1974, the aircraft, Martinair Flight 138 crashed into the mountain shortly before landing, killing all 191 people aboard – 182 Indonesian hajj pilgrims bound for Mecca, and 9 crew members.

See also 
 Geography of Sri Lanka
 List of mountains in Sri Lanka

References

Mountain ranges of Sri Lanka
Populated places in Nuwara Eliya District
Landforms of Central Province, Sri Lanka